Lane Education Service District (Lane ESD) is an education service district that provides services to the 16 school districts in Lane County, Oregon, United States. Its headquarters are at 1200 Highway 99N in Eugene.

Administration
Lane ESD's superintendent is Tony Scurto. An assistant superintendent, three service area directors and an executive assistant provide support. 

Lane ESD is governed by a citizen-elected Board of Directors and an appointed advisor representing employment training. Five of the Board positions represent geographical zones and two are designated at-large. All members serve four-year terms.

Districts
Lane ESD operates across the 16 school districts in Lane County:
Bethel School District
Blachly School District
Creswell School District
Crow-Applegate-Lorane School District
Eugene School District 4J
Fern Ridge School District
Junction City School District
Lowell School District
Mapleton School District
Marcola School District
McKenzie School District
Oakridge School District
Pleasant Hill School District
Siuslaw School District
South Lane School District
Springfield School District

See also
List of school districts in Oregon#Education service districts

References

External links
 

Education in Eugene, Oregon
Education in Lane County, Oregon
School districts in Oregon
Local government in Oregon